Harold John Deviney (April 11, 1893 – January 4, 1933) was a relief pitcher in Major League Baseball who played in one game for the Boston Red Sox during the 1920 season. He batted and threw right-handed. 

A native of Newton, Massachusetts, Deviney was a major league player whose career, statistically speaking, was only slightly different from that of Eddie Gaedel or Moonlight Graham.

On July 30, 1920, Deviney posted a 15.00 earned run average with three walks in 3.0 innings of work. He did not have a decision. But Deviney had more luck at the plate, going 2-for-2 with one run and a triple for a perfect 1.000 batting average. He never appeared in a major league game again.

Deviney died in Westwood, Massachusetts, at age 39.

See also
Boston Red Sox all-time roster

External links
Baseball Reference
Retrosheet

Boston Red Sox players
Major League Baseball pitchers
Baseball players from Massachusetts
1893 births
1933 deaths
New Bedford Whalers (baseball) players